Band-e Amir (also Romanized as Band-e Amīr and Bandāmir) is a village in Band-e Amir Rural District, Zarqan District, Shiraz County, Fars Province, Iran. At the 2006 census, its population was 1,424, in 370 families.

References 

Populated places in Zarqan County